The castra of Cincșor was a fort in the Roman province of Dacia in the 2nd and 3rd centuries AD.

Location
The ruins of this cohort fort are located about two kilometers east of the village Cincșor, commune Voila, and about one kilometer north of the river Olt in the corridor "Burgstadt". In ancient times, it probably had the task of monitoring the movement of goods on the Olt and the Cincu Pass to the north. Nothing more of the Roman military camp can be seen in today's landscape.

Finds
During the archaeological excavations of the years 1974/1975 and 1979 to 1992, small trenches were dug determining the location of the fort. Two construction phases could be distinguished.

It is possible that there was initially a wood-and-earth storage facility, which was later replaced by a stone fort. The stone fort had a rectangular ground plan but the dimensions could not be determined. On the west side of the stone fort, a defensive wall and four ditches were found. Due to the small material found, the dating is uncertain, but epigraphic finds could identify the Cohors II Flavia Bessorum as the stationed unit.

A funerary inscription for a Roman military official, L. Carvilius Rusticinus, was discovered near the castra.

In 1986 an excavator discovered a bronze parade mask nearby the fort, in the area of the reservoir lake. The mask depicts a woman's head. It has 24.5 cm height, 17 cm width and 14.5 cm depth.

Exhibition

The archaeological finds can be found in the Muzeul Țării Țării in Făgăraș and in Muzeul Județean Brașov in Brașov.

Monument protection

The entire archaeological site and in particular the fort are protected as historical monuments according to Act No. 422/2001 of 2001 and are protected with the LMI-Code BV-I-s-A-11266 in the National List of Historical Monuments., in particular the Directorate-General for National Cultural Heritage, the Department of Fine Arts and the National Commission for Historical Monuments and other institutions subordinate to the Ministry, is responsible for this. Unauthorised excavations and the export of antique objects are prohibited in Romania.

See also
List of castra

External links
Roman castra from Romania - Google Maps / Earth
ARCHAEOLOGICAL REPERTORY OF ROMANIA Archive Of The 'Vasile Parvan' Institute Of Archaeology - Site Location Index, page 10
details?articleID=2948 MONUMENTE. Masca unui calaret roman

Notes

Roman legionary fortresses in Romania
Ancient history of Transylvania
Historic monuments in Brașov County